Cyclomen may refer to:
 Cyclamen, the species
 Danazol, by trade name